Pakuranga is an eastern suburb of Auckland, in northern New Zealand. Pakuranga covers a series of low ridges and previously swampy flats, now drained, that lie between the Pakuranga Creek and Tamaki River, two estuarial arms of the Hauraki Gulf. It is located to the north of Manukau and 15 kilometres southeast of the Auckland CBD.

History 
The suburb's name comes from the Māori , meaning battle of the sunlight or battle of the sun's rays. The name refers to a fierce battle at Ōhuiarangi / Pigeon Mountain over forbidden love raged between two  - fairy people of the forest - until a priest caused the sun to rise and the earth to explode. Caught by the rays of the sun and volcanic eruptions, many patupaiarehe perished.

Pakuranga is traditionally home to the Ngāi Tai Iwi also known as Ngāi Tai ki Tāmaki. The prominent pā were at Ohuiarangi / Pigeon Mountain and Mokoia Pā of Ngāti Paoa at Panmure on a cliff, at the intersection of the Te Wai Ō Taiki / Tamaki River and the inlet to the Panmure Basin. During the attacks by Ngapuhi in the Musket wars in late September 1820, most of the population were killed, taken prisoner or fled south to the Waikato.

In early European times, it was a sparsely settled dairy farming area between the townships of Panmure and Howick. The area became more accessible after the opening of the Panmure Bridge, connecting Pakuranga to Panmure across the Tāmaki River, in 1865. In the 1920s and 30s it was served by a bus that ran from Bucklands Beach known as the "". In the 1930s a concrete road was built between these townships that improved transport times for people and milk. After the opening of the new Panmure Bridge in 1959, demand for more settlement land led to the development of Pakuranga. The increasing levels of car ownership in New Zealand led to Pakuranga becoming more suburban. In the 1970s it was considered the typical New Zealand middle class suburb, 'Vim Valley', after 'a typical Pakuranga housewife' was featured in a famous cleaning product ad.

Many of the American style houses of the 1950s and 1960s are still noticeable but much of the appeal of the early suburb lay in the proximity of untouched countryside. Since the 1970s Pakuranga has been surrounded and engulfed by suburban developments on a much larger scale but of less architectural merit. Traffic travelling to and from these suburbs and the centre of Auckland is largely funnelled through the roadways of Pakuranga which has degraded the area somewhat as well.

Despite this today Pakuranga remains an attractive suburb, with some light industry, centred on the Pakuranga Town Centre 1965, the second built in New Zealand, now known as "The Plaza". The mall is the second mall of the modern age in New Zealand, incorporating Farmers and George Court department stores. The mall itself has been transformed several times since it first went up and retains little of the 1960s style it once had. The Te Tuhi Centre for the Arts is located nearby.

Demographics

Pakuranga had a population of 7,689 at the 2018 New Zealand census, an increase of 444 people (6.1%) since the 2013 census, and an increase of 1,113 people (16.9%) since the 2006 census. There were 2,418 households, comprising 3,798 males and 3,888 females, giving a sex ratio of 0.98 males per female, with 1,521 people (19.8%) aged under 15 years, 1,719 (22.4%) aged 15 to 29, 3,411 (44.4%) aged 30 to 64, and 1,035 (13.5%) aged 65 or older.

Ethnicities were 44.4% European/Pākehā, 11.7% Māori, 13.2% Pacific peoples, 41.4% Asian, and 3.6% other ethnicities. People may identify with more than one ethnicity.

The percentage of people born overseas was 48.0, compared with 27.1% nationally.

Although some people chose not to answer the census's question about religious affiliation, 40.9% had no religion, 37.2% were Christian, 0.7% had Māori religious beliefs, 6.3% were Hindu, 3.4% were Muslim, 3.3% were Buddhist and 2.7% had other religions.

Of those at least 15 years old, 1,494 (24.2%) people had a bachelor's or higher degree, and 993 (16.1%) people had no formal qualifications. 864 people (14.0%) earned over $70,000 compared to 17.2% nationally. The employment status of those at least 15 was that 3,225 (52.3%) people were employed full-time, 774 (12.5%) were part-time, and 213 (3.5%) were unemployed.

Economy and amenities

Pakuranga Plaza

Pakuranga Plaza was established in 1965. It covers 28,000 m² with 1400 carparks. The plaza has 70 retailers, including Farmers, Countdown and The Warehouse.

Museums

Howick Historical Village is a recreation of a 19th century European settler village. It opened to the public in 1997.

Te Tuhi, an art gallery, opened in 1975.

Schools 

There was no school in the area before the 1960s so children had to walk or ride horses to the old Howick school which was located across from the Highland Park shops. The old school was moved to the old village display in Bells Rd, Pakuranga.

Edgewater College is a secondary school  (years 9–13) with a roll of  students.

Pakuranga Intermediate is an intermediate school  (years 7–8) with a roll of  students.

Saint Kentigern College is a private Presbyterian secondary school (years 7–13) with a roll of  students.

All these schools are coeducational. Rolls are as of

See also
Pakuranga (New Zealand electorate)

References

External links
History of Howick and Pakuranga
Google Map of Pakuranga
Te Tuhi Centre for the Arts
Photographs of Pakuranga held in Auckland Libraries' heritage collections.

Suburbs of Auckland
Populated places on the Tāmaki River
Howick Local Board Area